Valmar Castelo Sotto (born March 23, 1945), better known as Val Sotto, is a Filipino actor, singer, composer, and comedian. He was one of the lead vocalists of the Filipino band VST & Company. He appeared as the lead actor in Agila aired from 1987 to 1992 on RPN and ABS-CBN produced by TAPE Inc.

Personal life
Sotto is a great-nephew of former Senator Filemon Sotto and grandson of former Senator Vicente Sotto of Cebu City, Philippines. He is the eldest brother of Senator Tito Sotto, Marcelino Antonio "Maru" Sotto Jr. (former husband of actress Ali Carag-Sotto)  and Vic Sotto. He is an uncle of actresses and actors Ciara Sotto, Danica Sotto-Pingris, Oyo Sotto and the late Miko Sotto. He has been married to Theresa Marco-Sotto since December 14, 1969 and the couple have four children (including Viktor Eriko "Wahoo", the councilor of Parañaque) and they have 7 grandchildren.

Political career
He served as councilor in the second district of Parañaque from 2004 to 2013.

Filmography

Film
 Si Agimat at Si Enteng Kabisote (2013)
 Enteng Ng Ina Mo (2011) 
 Mr. Suave: Hoy! Hoy! Hoy! Hoy! Hoy! Hoy! (2003)
 Lastikman (2003)
 Basta't Ikaw... Nanginginig Pa (1999)
 Ang Tipong Kong Lalake (1995)
 Once Upon A Time In Manila (1994)
 Pandoy: Alalay Ng Panday (1993)
 Ligaw-ligawan, Kasal-kasalan, Bahay-bahayan (1993)
 The Return Of The Long Ranger & Tonton: How The West Was Wrong (1992)
 Tangga And Chos: Beauty Secret Agents (1990)
 Fly Me To The Moon (1988)
 Knock, Knock Who's There? (1988)
 Ready!... Aim!... Fire!... (1987)
 Shoot That Ball (1987)
 Send In The Clowns (1986)
 Super Wan-Tu-Tri (1985)
 Alexandra (1985)
 D'Gradwets (1981)
 Rock Baby, Rock (1979)
 Swing It... Baby! (1979)

Television
 Mars Pa More (2020) - guest
 Daddy's Gurl (2018)
 Bossing & Ai (2017)
 Tunay na Buhay (2017)
 Sabado Badoo (2015)
 Mars (2014-2019) - guest
 Vampire ang Daddy Ko (2013)
 Celebrity Samurai (2012) - guest
 The Jose & Wally Show Starring Vic Sotto (2011-2012) - guest
 Wow Mali Pa Rin (2011) - guest
 Pepito Manaloto (2010) - guest
 Who Wants to Be a Millionaire? (2009-2015) - guest
 Ful Haus (2008) - guest
 Bubble Gang (2005)
 Daddy Di Do Du (2002-2007)
 Back To Iskul Bukol (2001)
 1 for 3 (2000)
 Super Klenk (2000)
 Rio Del Mar (1999–2001)
 Wow Mali (1996-2008)
 ASAP Natin 'To (1995-2020) - guest
 Haybol Rambol (1995)
 Mixed N.U.T.S. (1994–1997)
 Eat Bulaga! (1994)
 TVJ on 5 (1993–1994)
 Rock En Roll 2000 (1992–1993)
 TVJ: Television Jesters (1989–1992)
 T.O.D.A.S.: Television's Outrageously Delightful All-Star Show (1981–1989)
 Okay Ka, Fairy Ko! (1987-1997)
 Agila (1987–1992)
 The Dawn & Jimmy Show (1986-1989) - guest
 Regal Shockers The Series (1985)
 Lovingly Yours, Helen (1984-1992)
 Iskul Bukol (1977-1989)
 OK Lang (1975-1977)

See also
Tito Sotto
Vic Sotto
Joey de Leon
Parañaque

References

External links

1945 births
Colegio de San Juan de Letran alumni
Filipino male comedians
20th-century Filipino male singers
Filipino actor-politicians
Manila sound musicians
Living people
People from Parañaque
Tagalog people
Male actors from Metro Manila
Metro Manila city and municipal councilors
Val